The Women's doubles tennis competition at the 2011 Pan Arab Games in Doha, Qatar was held from 13 December to 15 December at the Khalifa International Complex

Medalists

Seeds
   Fatyha Berjane / Nadia Lalami (final, silver medalists)
   Sarah Al Balushi / Fatma Al Nabhani (semifinals, bronze medalists)
   Nour Abbès / Ons Jabeur (semifinals, bronze medalists)
   Yasmeen Ebada / Ola Hammoud (champions, gold medalists)

Draw

Tournament bracket

External links

Events at the 2011 Pan Arab Games